Janco Uys is a South African rugby union player for the  in the Currie Cup. His regular position is hooker.

Uys was named in the  side for the 2021 Currie Cup Premier Division. He had previously been named in the  squad for the Pro14 Rainbow Cup SA.

References

South African rugby union players
Living people
Rugby union hookers
Griquas (rugby union) players
Year of birth missing (living people)
Bulls (rugby union) players